Tern Island is a tiny coral island located near French Frigate Shoals in the Northwestern Hawaiian Islands..

The island provides a breeding habitat to 18 species of seabirds, green sea turtles, and endangered Hawaiian monk seals. It is maintained as a field station in the Hawaiian Islands National Wildlife Refuge by the United States Fish and Wildlife Service.

The island has an airstrip crossing the length of the island. This has been supported by the U.S. Navy, Coast Guard, and wildlife services since that time.

The US Fish & Wildlife service closed its field station on the island at the end of 2012. A Naval base operated from 1942 to 1946, a Coast Guard Base from 1952 to 1979, and a Fish & Wildlife station from 1979 to 2012.

History

The atoll is home to an airstrip created in 1942-3 that was used by the Coast Guard. During WW2 ~130 people staffed the island, while the later wildlife station had between 5-15 staff.

After the Battle of Midway in the summer of 1942, the U.S. Navy built a Naval Air Station there, enlarging the island to support a 3300 ft. (1005 m) landing strip. The station's main function was as an emergency landing site for planes flying between Hawaii and Midway Atoll. The original seawall, runway, and some of the buildings remain.

Construction started in July 1942. The facility was commissioned in March 1943 as a Naval Air Station.

The base was meant to stop the Japanese using the atolls to attack mainland Hawaii, as had happened during Operation K. The island was expanded from 11 acres to 34 acres, and supported parking spots for 22 aircraft. A 90 foot tall radar tower and barracks for the island's crew were added. Reconnaissance Air patrols were flown from Tern island.

The base had some defenses during WW2, including a battery of 90 mm guns, 3-inch guns, and 30 cal machine guns emplacements. Having survived the battle of Midway, the base served as a stopping point for aircraft flying between Midway and the main Hawaiian islands, refueling or emergency landings.

One emergency landing occurred in 1944, when a Curfattis C-46 Commando with dozens of marines aboard had an engine failure and was close to ditching in the ocean. The twin-engine transport plane was down to an altitude of less than 300 feet, despite having ditched as much weight as feasible when it managed to land on Tern island. The aircraft was able to land with one engine out, and fatalities were avoided.

In 1945, Tern island hosted the USMC comedy show All Fouled Up when the entourage's R4D aircraft could not land at Midway due to fog. The show was performed at Tern island. 

The naval base operated from 1942 to 1946, and a U.S. Coast Guard station operated from  1952 until 1979. In 1969, a tsunami wiped out much of the station, and it had to be repaired. The crew was evacuated by helicopter by the ship HMNZS Waikato, and taken to Midway.

In 1946 two fisheries were established on Tern island, and they flew fish to Honolulu on a DC-3 aircraft.

From 1961 to 1983 a missile tracking station operated there.

Between 1986 and 1991 Tern Island was used to study the green sea turtle (Chelonia mydas).

A Piper Aztec has landed over 600 times at Tern Island. Monthly flights typically travel to Honolulu for mail, while heavier cargo usually comes by water. 

The Coast Guard barracks continued to be used into the 21st century. Upgrades included the cleanup of old waste, improved water tanks, and solar power. The solar power runs a reverse osmosis desalinator, capable of producing 1200 gallons a day. A diesel generator runs off a 500-gallon fuel tank.

In the summer of 2004, 1200 feet of seawall were repaired, and the boat dock was replaced by a boat ramp for small boats. However, thousands of feet of seawall were still in need of repair.

A Fish and Wild Life field station was active at the island from 1979 to 2012. Closure came after a storm in December 2012, when several people evacuated from Tern island in advance of the storm. The storm damaged facilities including the barracks. Fish & Wildlife service closed its field station at the end of 2012.

In 2013, the island was imaged for a Google Street View project, to allow the islands to be viewed online. Google and the US Government worked to make 5 islands viewable as part of this project. The other Pacific islands surveyed for the program included East Island (also in French Frigate Shoals), Laysan Island, Lisianski Island, and Pearl and Hermes Atoll. The viewer allows a series of panoramic images from head height to be viewed around the island. The path takes views along much of the length of the airstrip and along part of the shore.

In 2013 the NOAA ship Oscar Sette visited the French Frigate Shoals, and established a field camp  on Tern island. The storm at the end of 2012 had left the existing barracks uninhabitable, and the water system unusable. Water had to be brought to the island in jugs. The goods for the expedition were offloaded at the Tern island dock.

In 2019, a full survey of green sea turtles on Tern island was conducted. 371 green sea turtles were reported.

In 2020, the beach was designated as environmentally polluted by plastic trash. This ruling came after years of research at the site, including 14.5 thousand kilograms of trash discovered within 5000 meters of the beach over 11 years. Over 70 percent of the trash was plastic. Debris accumulation was studied in the 2010s.

In 2020, the Papahanaumokuakea Marine Debris Project removed tens of thousands of pounds of debris from the French Frigate Shoals, including Tern island.

Birds

The use of Tern Island by birds was studied. One concern is birds eating plastic trash, which was studied between 2006 and 2013. Tern Island is a popular research site to study Pacific sea and shore birds.

Some sixteen (16) seabird species inhabited Tern Island in the early 21st century, includoing:
 Sooty tern
 White tern
 Brown noddy
 Black noddy
 Masked booby
 Brown booby
 Red-footed booby
 Wedge-tailed shearwater
 Tristram's storm petrel
 Black-footed albatross
 Laysan albatross
 Great frigatebird

In 1998 and 1999, the black-footed albatross (Phoebastria nigripes) and Laysan albatross (Phoebastria immutabilis) were studied. The research recorded a particularly unsuccessful nesting season for the albatrosses.

In a 2010 study noted that other rare birds are sometimes seen at Tern. Examples of birds occasionally seen at Tern Island include the short-eared owl (Asio flammeus) and fork-tailed swift (Apus pacificus).

Tern Island is popular with green sea turtles; while in 1977 no nests were observed on the island; twenty years later, this had grown to around 700 nests.

Migratory shorebirds known to winter at Tern in the early 21st century include:
 Pacific golden plover  (Pluvialis  fulva)
 Ruddy turnstone  (Arenaria  interpres)
 Sanderling  (Calidris alba)
 Wandering tattler  (Heteroscelus  incanus)
 Bristle-thighed curlew  (Numenius tahitensis)

Seawall

During WW2 in response to the Japanese use of the atolls and to provide a link with Midway, the island was expanded to allow for a landing strip. The island was protected from the surf by a 5000 foot double steel pylon seawall, with walls separated by 4 feet (over 1 meter) finished in 1943. The original seawall is composed of over 5000 steel pilings. Maintenance on the wall was conducted by the U.S. Coast Guard between 1952 to 1979.

In 2000/1 the United States Congress approved 10 million USD to repair the island.

In 2004, the Fish & Wild Life service conducted a 12 million dollar project to repair the seawall and conduct other maintenance. This project repaired 1200 feet of seawall. The project was managed by the U.S. Army Corps of Engineers.

Geography
Island beaches include:
 Shell Beach & Crab Beach, on the north side of the island
 East Beach
 South Beach

A small boat ramp replaced dock and boat hoist in 2004.

See also

 French Frigate Shoals Airport
 Desert island
 List of islands

References

External links
  Ternisland.com
 Tern Island: Noah's Ark of the Hawaiian Isles
 Satellite View
 Google Street View July 2013
 Visible Earth
 Naval History YHB-10 (Used as barracks during WW2 at Tern island)

French Frigate Shoals
Northwestern Hawaiian Islands
Seabird colonies
Coral islands